There were a number of shipbuilders and shipwrights called Philemon Ewer
in the villages of Bursledon and Hamble in the River Hamble area of Hampshire, England during the 18th century.

The Master Shipbuilder 

The 'Master' shipbuilder was Philemon Ewer (19 July 1702 – 13 December 1750).  He was a
timber merchant and builder of small boats but gained an opportunity through
the outbreak of the 'War of Jenkins' Ear' to build Men of War for the
British government in 1739.

He also had a shipyard in East Cowes on the Isle of Wight.

He was buried at St Leonards in Bursledon on 16 December 1750 and has an elaborate memorial which records:

In Memory of MR PHILEMON EWER, who died the 13th day of December
A.D. 1750 aged 49 Years. During the late war with France & Spain
He build Seven large Ships of war for His Majesty's Service.
In the Execution of that important Trust He gained, and deserved,
the Reputation of an ingenious Artist and excellent workman
and an honest Man. All his Undertakings were crowned with Success,
And all his Industry justly rewarded With a fair Character & a plentiful
Fortune; The first of which he left for ye Imitation
The second for the Support & Enjoyment Of his numerous Family;
who in Gratitude erected This Monument A:D: 1754

His seven ships were:

He also built a large house in the village from the proceeds.  It was called 'Elm Lodge' at the time but is now known as 'Greyladyes' and is home to the 'Greyladyes Arts Foundation' Google Maps Link.

There is also an 18th-century house called 'Ewers' on Lands End Road in Bursledon that was owned by the family. Google Maps link

Other Philemon Ewers
 The Master Shipbuilder's father (died 1730) Built trading ships mainly at Hamble
 The Master Shipbuilder's son (1735 - 1797) Seems to have been known as 'Captain' (most likely due to his position in the local militia) and lived at 'Elm Lodge' in Bursledon Google Maps Link- He does appear to have continued building smaller ships for the navy up to at least 1757 and left provision for his eldest son to be placed under an eminent shipwright in his will
 The Master Shipbuilder's nephew (1726 - 1792) Lived at 'Upcott House'  in Bursledon Google Maps Link - Owned sloops for trading purposes and was also a maltster and timber merchant.  He is recorded as offering to build ships for the navy.
 Both the Master shipbuilder's son and nephew had a son together named Philemon.

References

 HOLLAND,A.J. Ships of British Oak: The Rise and Decline of Wooden Shipbuilding in Hampshire Newton Abbot, David & Charles. 1971.()

UK National Archives 
 1750 Philemon Ewer (Master Shipbuilder) Will - Reference 'PROB 11/785' 
 1797 Philemon Ewer (Son of Master Shipbuilder) Will - Reference 'PROB 11/1287'
 There are a number of letters referring to Philemon Ewer in the 'ADM' series

External links
 Philemon Ewer at Maritime Memorials
 Greyladyes Arts Foundation (House built by 'The Master Shipbuilder')
 Career of HMS Vanguard

English shipbuilders
1702 births
1750 deaths
People from Bursledon